Fălticeni is a town in Suceava County, northeastern Romania. It is situated in the historical region of Western Moldavia. Fălticeni is the second largest urban settlement in the county, with a population of 24,619 inhabitants, according to the 2011 census. It was declared a municipality in 1995, along with two other cities in Suceava County: Rădăuți and Câmpulung Moldovenesc.

It was the capital of former Baia County (1929–1950). The town is known for the high number of Romanian writers, artists, and scientists who were born, lived, studied, or have created here.

Geography 
Fălticeni is located in the southern part of Suceava County, 25 km away from Suceava, the capital of the county. The European route E85 crosses the city. Fălticeni is connected to the Romanian national railway system, through Dolhasca train station (24 km away). The city of Roman is 80 km south, on E85 road.

Administration and local politics

Town council 

The town's current local council has the following political composition, according to the results of the 2020 Romanian local elections:

History
The earliest written mention of the village Folticeni is from March 1490, and the second from March 1554, when Moldavian Prince Alexandru Lăpuşneanu awarded the estate and the village bearing the aforesaid name to Moldovița Monastery.

Fălticeni was first mentioned as an urban settlement in August 1780 as Târgul Șoldănești (Șoldănești Market), after the name of a local boyar's estate, in a document issued by the chancellery of Prince Constantin Moruzi. In March 1826, an edict issued by Prince Ioan Sturdza changed the name of the town to Fălticeni.

Fălticeni was bombed by the Bolsheviks during World War I.

Between 1929 and 1950 Fălticeni was the capital of former Baia County. From 1950 to present the city is part of Suceava County.

In the year 1921 the Faltishan (Yiddish for Fălticeni) Hasidic dynasty was founded in Fălticeni, by Rabbi Eluzar Twersky, a scion of the Skver Hasidic sect, and part of the prestigious royal Hasidic Twersky family. Today they are Jewish communities in Brooklyn, New York carrying on the name Faltishan, led by Rabbi Twersky's descendants.

Demographics 

Fălticeni reached its peak population in 1992, when almost 33,000 people were living within the city limits. As of 2016, the town of Fălticeni was the third largest urban settlement in Suceava County, after the county capital, Suceava, and the town of Rădăuți.

According to the 2011 census data, 24,619 inhabitants lived in Fălticeni, a decrease from the figure recorded at the 2002 census, when the city had a population of 29,787 inhabitants. In 2011, of the city total population, 98.15% were ethnic Romanians, 0.76% Roma, 0.75% Russians (including Lipovans), 0.07% Hungarians, 0.04% Germans (Regat Germans), 0.02% Ukrainians, and 0.01% Poles.

Culture

There are four museums in Fălticeni. Ion Irimescu Art Museum (Muzeul de Artă "Ion Irimescu") houses the largest collection of works of art by a single artist, Ion Irimescu, one of Romania's greatest sculptors and sketchers, as well as a member of the Romanian Academy. The museum building is a historic monument, dating from the middle of the 19th century and had various destinations until 1974, when it was given to the art museum. In 1974 Ion Irimescu took the initiative to establish the museum, at first as a department of the Town Museum and made some donations. Later the value of the collection grew, currently being the richest author collection, and in 1991 an independent museum emerged. It comprises the most representative works by the sculptor Ion Irimescu: 313 sculptures and 1000 drawings: portraits, compositions, monument project carried out in the rondebosse or alterorelief technique, in gypsum, wood, terracotta, marble, bronze works of graphics especially donated to the museum by the author. The museum also includes the artist's personal library (1500 volumes).

Mihai Băcescu Water Museum (Muzeul Apelor "Mihai Băcescu") was founded in 1982 by the Romanian zoologist Mihai Băcescu, who was also a member of the Romanian Academy. This museum of natural sciences represents the enhancement and the development of the first museum established in Fălticeni, in 1914, by the professor Vasile Ciurea.

Fălticeni is the hometown of the Lovinescu family, which gave Romania four of its most distinguished men of letters of the 20th century: literary critic Eugen Lovinescu, playwright Horia Lovinescu, esoterist Vasile Lovinescu and novelist Anton Holban. The Lovinescu family contributed to founding a memorial museum in Fălticeni, House of Notable People (Galeria Oamenilor de Seamă). The museum was opened in 1972 and represents a synthesis of the city's cultural and intellectual life.

Classics of Romanian literature, such as Ion Creangă, Mihail Sadoveanu, Vasile Alecsandri, or Nicolae Labiș, at some point in their life linked their name with that of the city by both studying and living in Fălticeni. Mihail Sadoveanu Memorial House (Casa memorială "Mihail Sadoveanu") is a museum founded in 1987 in Fălticeni, in the house where Mihail Sadoveanu lived and created between 1909 and 1918.

Economy
The main industries of the city are chemical manufacture, hand-made glass, manufacturing soft drinks, clothing, and wood products. Also the fishing industry is one of the oldest base industry in the city. Most of these industries have died down after the Communist era.

Natives
 Costin Anton - painter 
 Ionuț Atodiresei - kickboxer
 Adrian Avrămia - footballer
 Aurel Băeșu - painter
 J. J. Benjamin - historian and traveler
 Grigore Vasiliu Birlic - actor
 Jules Cazaban - actor, director
 Ion Dragoslav - writer
 Nicu Gane - writer, politician
 Arthur Gorovei - writer, folklorist, ethnographer
 Ștefan S. Gorovei - historian
 Sofia Ionescu - neurosurgeon
 Ion Irimescu - sculptor, sketcher
 Alexandru Lambrior - folklorist
 Dimitrie Leonida - engineer, scientist
 Eugen Lovinescu - literary historian, literary critic, novelist
 Vasile Lovinescu - esoterist
 Vasile Maftei - footballer
 Maria Olaru - gymnast
 Mayer Schorr - hazzan
 Constantin Schumacher - footballer
 Gilles Ségal - actor, playwright
 Rabbi Mordechai Stein - Faltishaner Rabbe
 Teodor Tatos - painter, writer, lawyer
Not born in Fălticeni, but artistically active there was also:
 Reuven Rubin - painter

Gallery

References

External links

  

 
Cities in Romania
Jewish communities in Romania
Capitals of former Romanian counties
Localities in Western Moldavia
Populated places in Suceava County